The yellow-eyed junco (Junco phaeonotus) is a species of junco, a group of small New World sparrows.

Its range is primarily in Mexico, extending into some of the mountains of the southern tips of the U.S. states of Arizona and New Mexico. It is not generally migratory, but sometimes moves to nearby lower elevations during winter. The female lays three to five pale gray or bluish-white eggs in an open nest of dried grass two to three times a year. Incubation takes 15 days, and when hatched, the chicks are ready to leave the nest two weeks later. This bird's diet consists mainly of seeds, berries and insects.

Taxonomy
The yellow-eyed junco was formally described in 1831 by the German naturalist Johann Georg Wagler from a specimen collected in Mexico. He introduced a new genus, Junco, and coined the binomial name Junco phaeonotus. The genus name is from Latin iuncus meaning "rush". The specific epithet combines the Ancient Greek  phaios meaning "dusky" or "brown" with -nōtos meaning "-backed".

Four subspecies are recognised:

 Arizona yellow-eyed junco (J. p. palliatus) Ridgway, 1885 – southwestern U.S. and northwestern Mexico
 Mexican yellow-eyed junco (J. p. phaeonotus) Wagler, 1831 – central and southern Mexico
 Chiapas yellow-eyed junco (J. p. fulvescens) Nelson, 1897 – interior of Chiapas (southern Mexico)
 Guatemalan yellow-eyed junco (J. p. alticola) Salvin, 1863 – southeastern Chiapas (southern Mexico) and western Guatemala

Related species
Baird's junco (Junco bairdi) was previously considered a subspecies of this species.

References

External links
Yellow-eyed junco (Junco phaeonotus) at the Internet Bird Collection

yellow-eyed junco
Native birds of the Western United States
Birds of Mexico
Birds of Guatemala
yellow-eyed junco